End of days may refer to:

Arts, entertainment, and media

Films
 End of Days (film), a 1999 supernatural film

Music 
 The End of Days, a 2010 album by Abney Park
 End of Days (soundtrack), a soundtrack album from the 1999 film
 "End of Days", a song by Bullet for My Valentine from Scream Aim Fire
 End of Days (Discharge album), a 2016 album by English hardcore punk band Discharge

Television
 "End of Days" (Buffy the Vampire Slayer), a 2003 television episode
 "End of Days" (Torchwood), a 2007 television episode
 "End of Days" (2001), Episode 21 of Queen of Swords (TV series)
 "End of Days", an episode of Hart of Dixie

Other uses in arts, entertainment, and media
 Daredevil: End of Days, an American comic book series
 End of Days (book, 2008), a novel by Sylvia Browne
 End of Days (book, 2012), a novel by Eric Walters
 The End of Days (book, 2015), a novel by Jenny Erpenbeck

Religion 
 Eschatology, a religious concept also known as the end of days
 Jewish eschatology

See also 
 End of All Days, album by Rage
 End of day, the end of the trading day in a financial market
 EOD (disambiguation)
 End time (disambiguation)